Khao Suan Kwang railway station is a railway station located in Kham Muang Subdistrict, Khao Suan Kwang District, Khon Kaen Province.

References 

Railway stations in Thailand
Khon Kaen province